Switzer may refer to:

Places
Switzer, Kentucky
Switzer, South Carolina
Switzer, West Virginia
Switzers, New Zealand, the former name of the town of Waikaia, New Zealand
Switzer Canyon, San Diego, California
Barry Switzer Center, University of Oklahoma
Mary Switzer Building, Washington D.C.
Nicholas Switzer House

Other uses
A person from Switzerland
Specifically, one of the Swiss mercenaries
Switzer (surname)
Switzer Unlimited, Canadian talk show television series
Skinner v. Switzer, a legal dispute that was decided by the U.S. Supreme Court
Switzer's Asylum, homes for the elderly

See also
William A. Switzer Provincial Park, Alberta, Canada
Schweitzer, a surname
Schweizer (disambiguation)
Swiss (disambiguation)